Bolshaya Privalovka is a rural locality (a selo) and the administrative center of Bolsheprivalovskoye Rural Settlement, Verkhnekhavsky District, Voronezh Oblast, Russia. The population was 582 as of 2010. There are 13 streets.

Geography 
Bolshaya Privalovka is located 16 km northwest of Verkhnyaya Khava (the district's administrative centre) by road. Belovka is the nearest rural locality.

References 

Rural localities in Verkhnekhavsky District